Juan Carlos Salazar Gómez is the Secretary-General of the International Civil Aviation Organization (ICAO). Since May 2018, he had served as Director of the Colombian Civil Aviation Authority, a presidentially appointed position.

References 

International Civil Aviation Organization people
Harvard University alumni
McGill University alumni
Pontifical Bolivarian University alumni
Civil aviation in Colombia
Year of birth missing (living people)
Living people